"How Long Will My Baby Be Gone" is a 1968 song written and recorded by Buck Owens.

Overview 
"How Long Will My Baby Be Gone" was the last of eight number ones on the country chart in a row for Buck Owens.  The single spent a single week at number one and a total of thirteen weeks on the country chart. The song is still performed at the Country Bear Jamboree attraction at certain Disney parks.

Chart performance

References

1968 singles
Buck Owens songs
Songs written by Buck Owens
Song recordings produced by Ken Nelson (American record producer)
Capitol Records singles
1968 songs